Katusice is a municipality and village in Mladá Boleslav District in the Central Bohemian Region of the Czech Republic. It has about 800 inhabitants.

Administrative parts
Villages of Doubravice, Spikaly, Trnová and Valovice are administrative parts of Katusice. Doubravice and Trnová form an exclave of the municipal territory.

Geography
It lies in the Jizera Table.

History
The first written mention of Katusice is from 1352, when the local church was documented.

Transport
Katusice is located on a railway line from Mělník to Mladá Boleslav and Mladějov.

Sights
The landmark of Katusice is the Church of the Assumption of the Virgin Mary. It is a neo-Gothic parish church with a Gothic-Renaissance core. It was built in 1853–1857.

References

External links

Villages in Mladá Boleslav District